Taoyuan Public Library Longgang Branch (Longgang is spelled variously as Lunggang sometimes) is a branch of Taoyuan Public Library, located within Zhongli, Taoyuan City, Taiwan. The library was opened in December 2015, it is the first public library in  area and the third in Zhongli district.

Architecture

Longgang branch was designed by CTLU Architect & Associates. On the outside, the library looks like a bookshelf, and it has a large number of wooden elements and wooden tables and chairs.

Collection
Besides Chinese books, there's new immigrants area with multicultural elements such as books for new immigrants from Southeast Asia, including Thailand, Indonesia, Vietnam, and Myanmar.

References

Public libraries in Taiwan
Libraries in Taoyuan City
Zhongli District